Carsac-Aillac is a commune in the Dordogne department in Nouvelle-Aquitaine in southwestern France.

Population

Notable people
 Marius Rossillon, aka O'Galop (1867-1946), creator of the Bibendum Michelin, died in Carsac-Aillac
 Solange Sanfourche, (1922–2013), alias Marie-Claude, was a French resistance fighter born in Carsac-Aillac

Sights
Jardins d'Eau

See also
Communes of the Dordogne department

References

Communes of Dordogne